Josh Rand (born August 19, 1974) is an American musician best known as the rhythm guitarist of the band Stone Sour.

Josh Rand started playing bass guitar when he was 9, inspired by Billy Sheehan, Cliff Burton, Frankie Bello and Jason Newsted. He has known Corey Taylor since he was 15.  The two played in several bands together before Josh switched to guitar at age 17. Rand has said that after hearing the band Racer X he knew playing the guitar was right for him.
Rand earned a professional certificate in guitar from Berklee College of Music and is currently pursuing a master's degree in guitar there as well.

Stone Sour

Josh Rand is the second longest-serving member of Stone Sour after Corey Taylor, they have both gone on to release six studio albums and two covers EP's with the band. Rand has stated that he adds elements of metal in Stone Sour's music.

Roadrunner United

In 2005, Roadrunner Records released Roadrunner United: The All-Star Sessions to celebrate the label's 25th birthday. Josh Rand, along with Jesse Leach (Killswitch Engage, Seemless, The Empire Shall Fall), Matt Heafy (Trivium), Mike D'Antonio (Killswitch Engage, ex-Overcast, Death Ray Vision) and Johnny Kelly (Type O Negative) contributed a track "Blood & Flames".

Other projects

In 2013 Josh Rand released an instructional DVD called 'The Sound And The Story'. The DVD series takes you behind the scenes with Stone Sour guitarist Josh Rand, it features guitar contents, lessons, exercises, interviews, gear tours, and more.

When Stone Sour went on hiatus in 2020, Rand teamed up with Paralandra vocalist Casandra Carson to form LIFE Project. Their debut single was released in April 2021.

Discography

Stone Sour
 2002: Stone Sour
 2006: Come What(ever) May
 2007: Live in Moscow
 2010: Audio Secrecy
 2011: Live in Brighton Fan Club DVD
 2012: House of Gold & Bones – Part 1
 2013: House of Gold & Bones – Part 2
 2015: Meanwhile in Burbank...
 2015: Straight Outta Burbank...
 2017: Hydrograd
Roadrunner United
 2005: The All-Star Sessions
LIFE Project
 2021: The LIFE Project EP

Filmography
 2010: The Making of Audio Secrecy
 2013: Josh Rand: The Sound and The Story

References

1974 births
Living people
Stone Sour members
American heavy metal guitarists
American pop rock musicians
Musicians from Des Moines, Iowa
Guitarists from Iowa
21st-century American bass guitarists